The Roman Catholic Diocese of Novo Mesto  is a diocese in the city of Novo Mesto in the Ecclesiastical province of Ljubljana in Slovenia.

History
 April 7, 2006: Established as Diocese of Novo Mesto from the Metropolitan Archdiocese of Ljubljana

Leadership
 Bishops of Novo Mesto (Roman rite)
 Bishop Andrej Glavan (7 April 2006 – 30 June 2021)
 Bishop Andrej Saje (30 June 2021 – present)

See also
Roman Catholicism in Slovenia

External links
 
 GCatholic.org
 Catholic Hierarchy

Roman Catholic dioceses in Slovenia
Christian organizations established in 2006
Roman Catholic dioceses and prelatures established in the 21st century